Empire: Original Soundtrack Season 2 Volume 2 is the third soundtrack album by the cast of the musical drama television series Empire which airs on Fox. The album includes songs that featured during the second season of the show. It was released on April 29, 2016. The Soundtrack was Recorded & Mixed at Periscope Post & Audio in Chicago, IL. Mixed By Jason Nuemann, Andrew Twiss, Kevin Davis, Justin Hind, Matt Gubernick, Jim Beanz, & Rodney "Every Ave" Murrille.

Track listing

Charts

Weekly charts

Year-end charts

References

2016 soundtrack albums
Columbia Records soundtracks
Empire (2015 TV series)
Albums produced by Timbaland
Television soundtracks
Albums produced by J. R. Rotem
Albums produced by Ne-Yo
Albums produced by Swizz Beatz